"Centerpiece" is a 1958 jazz standard. It was written by Harry Edison and Jon Hendricks.

The song is a love song, with the lyrics indicating that the singer feels incomplete without his lover. Each of the two verses ends with the couplet:
But nothing's any good without you
'Cause baby you're my centerpiece

Covers
Joni Mitchell incorporated the song into a medley, with her own "Harry's House", on her 1975 album The Hissing of Summer Lawns. Jazz singer Roseanna Vitro recorded the song on her 1984 debut LP, Listen Here.

See also
List of jazz standards

References

1950s jazz standards
1958 songs
Jazz compositions in A-flat major